The 2004–05 season was Football Club Internazionale Milano's 96th in existence and 89th consecutive season in the top flight of Italian football.

Season overview
The summer of 2004 saw Inter choose a new coach, Roberto Mancini coming from Lazio. Inter started the season qualifying for the Champions League group phase, but also collected many draws in the league.

Inter, achieved better results in cups, made a known comeback (3–2) in a match against Sampdoria, scoring all goals in the last six minutes. The derby with Milan was lost 1–0 which broke a positive streak, in May 2004. the rivals also knocked Inter out of the Champions League, tournament in which – during the previous two-legs – Mancini's squad had been beaten by reigning champions Porto. Inter achieved a third-place finish in the league. The win of the Coppa Italia final against Roma, 3–0 on aggregate, closed the season.

Players

Squad information

From youth squad

Transfers

Winter

Competitions

Overview

Serie A

League table

Results summary

Results by round

Matches

Coppa Italia

Round of 16

Quarter-finals

Semi-finals

Final

UEFA Champions League

Qualifying phase

Third qualifying round

Group stage

Knockout phase

Round of 16

Quarter-finals

Statistics

Squad statistics
{|class="wikitable" style="text-align: center;"
|-
!
! style="width:70px;"|League
! style="width:70px;"|Europe
! style="width:70px;"|Cup
! style="width:70px;"|Total Stats
|-
|align=left|Games played       || 38 || 12 || 8 || 58
|-
|align=left|Games won          || 18 || 6  || 7 || 31
|-
|align=left|Games drawn        || 18 || 4  || 1 || 23
|-
|align=left|Games lost         || 2  || 2  || 0 || 4
|-
|align=left|Goals scored       || 65 || 23 ||17 || 105
|-
|align=left|Goals conceded     || 37 || 12 || 4 || 53
|-
|align=left|Goal difference    || 28 || 11 ||13 || 52
|-
|align=left|Clean sheets       || 17 || 3 || 4 || 24
|-
|align=left|Goal by substitute || – || – || – || –
|-
|align=left|Total shots        || – || – || – || –
|-
|align=left|Shots on target    || – || – || – || –
|-
|align=left|Corners            || – || – || – || –
|-
|align=left|Players used       || 31 || 26 ||28 || –
|-
|align=left|Offsides           || – || – || – || –
|-
|align=left|Fouls suffered     || – || – || – || –
|-
|align=left|Fouls committed    || – || – || – || –
|-
|align=left|Yellow cards       || 55 || 21 || 10|| 86
|-
|align=left|Red cards          || 1 || 1 || – || 2
|-

Appearances and goals
As of 15 June 2005

Goalscorers
{| class="wikitable sortable" style="font-size: 95%; text-align: center;"
|-
!width="7%"|No.
!width="7%"|Pos.
!width="7%"|Nation
!width="20%"|Name
!Serie A
!Coppa Italia
!Champions League
!Total
|-
| 10
| FW
| 
| Adriano
| 16 
| 2 
| 10 
|28 
|-
| 30
| FW
| 
| Obafemi Martins
| 11 
| 6 
| 5 
|22 
|-
| 32
| FW
| 
| Christian Vieri
| 13 
| 3 
| 1 
|17 
|-
| 9
| FW
| 
| Julio Cruz
| 5 
| 2 
| 2 
|9 
|-
| 25
| MF
| 
| Dejan Stanković
| 3 
| 0 
| 3 
|6 
|-
| 20
| FW
| 
| Álvaro Recoba
| 3 
| 2 
| 1 
|6 
|-
| 11
| DF
| 
| Siniša Mihajlović
| 4 
| 1 
| 0 
|5 
|-
| 2
| DF
| 
| Iván Córdoba
| 3 
| 0 
| 0 
|3 
|-
| 14
| MF
| 
| Juan Sebastián Verón
| 3 
| 0 
| 0 
|3 
|-
| 19
| MF
| 
| Esteban Cambiasso
| 2 
| 0 
| 0 
|2 
|-
| 5
| MF
| 
| Emre Belözoğlu
| 0 
| 1 
| 0 
|1 
|-
| 7
| MF
| 
| Andy van der Meyde
| 0 
| 0 
| 1 
|1 
|-
| 13
| DF
| 
| Zé Maria
| 1 
| 0 
| 0 
|1 
|-
| #
| colspan=3 | Own goals
| 1 
| 0 
| 0 
|1 
|-
|- bgcolor="F1F1F1" 
| colspan=4 | TOTAL
| 65 
| 17 
| 23 
| 105

References

External links
Official website

Inter Milan seasons
Internazionale